The 2020–21 Ghana Women's Premier League (GWPL) is the top division league for women. The league was launched in 2012 and it is currently in its 8th season. Hasaacas Ladies were crowned champions after beating Ampem Darkoa FC 4–0 in the Championship final.

Season overview 
The women's league went on a long break for the 2019–2020 season due to the COVID-19 pandemic. The season for 2020–2021 was set to kick off on 15 January 2021. The league is played in two zones: the Northern Zone and the Southern Zone. Winners of the northern and southern zones then meet in a championship final to declare the champions for the season.

Prize money 

 The club that places first in the league season would earn a trophy along with a cash prize of GHC50,000, 40 gold medals.
 The club that places second in the league season would receive GHC 30,000 and 40 silver medals.
 The club that places third in the league season would earn an amount of GHC 15,000 and 40 bronze medals.

Teams

Stadiums and locations 
Note: Table lists in alphabetical order.

Club managers and captains 
Note: Table lists in alphabetical order.

League table

Northern Zone 

Source: Ghana Football Association

Southern Zone 

Source: Ghana Football Association

Championship final

Statistics

Top scorers 

The 1st goal of the season was scored by Nina Norshie (Berry Ladies).

The 100th goal of the season was scored by Victoria Salifu (Northern Ladies).

Awards

Monthly awards 
The monthly awards were sponsored by NASCO Ghana.

Annual awards 
The annual awards were given during the championship final.

See also 

 Ghana Women’s Premier League
 2020–21 Ghana Premier League
2021 Ghana Women's FA Cup

References

External links 

 Official Website
 2020–21 Ghana Women's Premier League at RSSF 

women
1
Women's sports leagues in Ghana
2020–21 domestic women's association football leagues
2020–21 in Ghanaian football